Kalamandalam Sugandhi is a Mohiniyattam dancer, choreographer and dance teacher from Kerala, India. She received several awards including Sangeet Natak Akademi Award, Kerala Sangeetha Nataka Akademi Award, Kerala Sangeetha Nataka Akademi Fellowship, Kerala Konkani Sahitya Academy Award and Kerala Kalamandalam Award.

Biography
Kalamandalam Sugandhi was born on 1950 December 2, in a Konkani family at Valamgalam near Thuravoor in Alappuzha district to G. Sreenivasa Kamath and Anandi Kamath. The family had given her considerable support in making her a dancer. She started learning Bharathanatyam at the age of seven from Sathidevi, a graduate of Thrippunithura RLV College of Music and Fine Arts. After two years, she trained Bharathanatyam under Palluruthy Surendranath.

At the suggestion of K. N. Pisharody, Guru Gopinath, Tripunithura Madhava Menon and Kavalam Narayana Panicker, her father added Sugandhi to study in the Kerala Kalamandalam. At the time of joining, her basic interest was on Bharathanatyam. In Kalamandalam she studied under Kalamandalam Satyabhama, Kalamandalam Chandrika and A. B. R. Bhaskar. She studied Mohinayattam in 1968, as part of the last phase of the Bharathanatyam diploma course.

After compleating the course in 1969, at the age of 19, M. K. K. Nair the then chairman of Kalamandalam, who was also the chairman of FACT, appointed her as Mohiniyattam teacher in the art department of FACT. That is how she gets closer to Mohiniyattayam. Realizing Sugandhi's fascination with classical dance forms, Nair sent her to Vedanta Prahlad Sharma to study Kuchipudi.

Sugandhi met Bharathanatyam exponent Padma Subramaniam at a dance event in FACT and their relationship turned into a deep friendship.

Later, in her 50s, she studied B.A in Malayalam from University of Calicut, and M.A in Mohiniyattam from Kerala Kalamandalam. At the age of 71, Sugandhi done her Doctorate in "Development of Pedagogy for Mohiniyattam Based on Natya Sastra" from Thanjavur Sastra University under Padma Subramaniam. Currently she is working as the Academic Dean in Kerala Kalamandalam.

Personal life
Sugandhi and her husband K. R. Damodara Prabhu have two children, Nanditha Prabhu, who is the founder of Mythri Centre for Arts, Chennai, and Naveen D. Prabhu who is a colonel in Indian Army. Prabhu was an employee of FACT where she first joined as a Mohiniyattam teacher. They resides in Vidyanagar, near Cochin University campus in Ernakulam district.

Noted performances
Some of her performances include a full-length Mohiniyattam concert based on works of Swathi Thirunal Rama Varma, Radha Madhavam based on Ashtapadi and Chithrangam, a dance Self-composed and taught to over a thousand dancers, on the occasion of the arrival of Sri Sri Ravi Shankar to Kerala.

Notable disciples
Her disciples include Neena Prasad, Gopika Varma, Pallavi Krishnan, Swetha Mangalath, Priya Nair.

Books written
Bharata Kala Lakshanam (Malayalam translation of Padma Subrahmanyam's Tamil book Bharata Kalai Kotpadu)
Natyavedu-Panchovo Vedu (in Konkani)
Now she is writing a book Hasta Ratnakaram which deals with hand gestures in Mohiniyattam

Awards and honours
Kerala State Schools Youth Festival 1962, First in Bharathanatyam
First in Kerala Kalamandakam Bharathanatyam competition 1962
Pundareenath Bhuvanendra Award of the Kerala Konkani Sahitya Academy 1971
Kerala Sangeetha Nataka Akademi Award 1985
ITC Golden Greats Award 1990
Senior Fellowship from Human Resource Development Ministry, Govt of India 1990
Pundareenath Bhuvanendra Puraskar from Kerala Konkini Sahithya Academy 1997
Award from Tapasya Sahithya Vedi and New Delhi Samskrita Bharati 1997
Kerala Kalamandalam Award 1999
Senior Fellowship from Ministry of Culture, Govt. of India 2003
Dr.T.M.A Pai Foundation Award 2003
Sangeet Natak Akademi Award 2004
Kerala Sangeetha Nataka Akademi Fellowship 2011
Kalaratna award from Kerala Sangeetha Nataka Akademi 2012

References

1950 births
Recipients of the Sangeet Natak Akademi Award
Indian female classical dancers
Performers of Indian classical dance
Mohiniyattam exponents
Living people
Dancers from Kerala
Women artists from Kerala
20th-century Indian dancers
20th-century Indian women artists
Indian dance teachers
Indian classical choreographers
Indian women choreographers
Konkani people
People from Alappuzha district
Recipients of the Kerala Sangeetha Nataka Akademi Fellowship
Recipients of the Kerala Sangeetha Nataka Akademi Award